Lepassaare is a village in Võru Parish, Võru County, in southeastern Estonia.

Lepassaare has a station on currently inactive Valga–Pechory railway.

References

 

Võru Parish
Villages in Võru County